In continuum mechanics, including fluid dynamics, an upper-convected time derivative or Oldroyd derivative, named after James G. Oldroyd, is the rate of change of some tensor property of a small parcel of fluid that is written in the coordinate system rotating and stretching with the fluid. 

The operator is specified by the following formula:

where:
 is the upper-convected time derivative of a tensor field 
 is the substantive derivative
 is the tensor of velocity derivatives for the fluid.

The formula can be rewritten as:

By definition, the upper-convected time derivative of the Finger tensor  is always zero.

It can be shown that the upper-convected time derivative of a spacelike vector field is just its Lie derivative by the velocity field of the continuum.

The upper-convected derivative is widely used in polymer rheology for the description of the behavior of a viscoelastic fluid under large deformations.

Examples for the symmetric tensor A

Simple shear
For the case of simple shear:

Thus,

Uniaxial extension of incompressible fluid
In this case a material is stretched in the direction X and compresses in the directions Y and Z, so to keep volume constant.
The gradients of velocity are:

Thus,

See also
Upper-convected Maxwell model

References
 

Notes

Multivariable calculus
Fluid dynamics
Non-Newtonian fluids